Terebra babylonia is a species of sea snail, a marine gastropod mollusc in the family Terebridae, the auger snails.

Description

Distribution
This marine species occurs in the East Pacific and off Papua New Guinea

References

 Terryn, Y. (2007). Terebridae: A Collectors Guide. Conchbooks & Natural Art. 59 pp + plates
 Severns, M. (2011). Shells of the Hawaiian Islands - The Sea Shells. Conchbooks, Hackenheim. 564 pp
 Steyn, D. G.; Lussi, M. (2005). Offshore Shells of Southern Africa: A pictorial guide to more than 750 Gastropods. Published by the authors. pp. i–vi, 1–289.

External links
 Lamarck, (J.-B. M.) de. (1822). Histoire naturelle des animaux sans vertèbres. Tome septième. Paris: published by the Author, 711 pp
 Gray, J. E. (1834). Enumeration of the species of Terebra, with characters of many hitherto undescribed. Proceedings of the Zoological Society of London. (1834) 2: 59-63.

Terebridae
Gastropods described in 1822